Flashback(s)  or Flash Back may refer to:

 Flashback (narrative), in literature and drama, a scene that takes the narrative back in time
 Flashback (psychology), in which a memory is suddenly and unexpectedly revisited
 Acid flashback, a reported psychological effect of LSD use
 Flashback (welding), a hazard of using an oxyacetylene torch
 Flashback arrestor, a safety device used in oxy-fuel welding and cutting

Computing 
 Flashback (Trojan), computer malware that infects computers running Mac OS X
 Atari Flashback series, a line of video-game consoles that emulate 1980s-era Atari games
 Oracle Flashback, a means of retrieving data as it existed in an Oracle database at an earlier time
 Flashback Forum, a Swedish online forum.

Film, television and radio
 Flashback (1969 film), an Italian film by Raffaele Andreassi
 Flashback (1990 film), an American film by Franco Amurri
 Flashback (2020 film), a Canadian film by Christopher MacBride
 Flashback (2021 film), a French film by  Caroline Vigneaux
 Flashback (TV series), a 1962–1968 Canadian quiz show
 Flashback (radio program), an American syndicated radio program
 Flashback, a Flash animation using a song from the Shpongle album Are You Shpongled?

Television episodes
 "Flashback" (Desperate Housewives)
 "Flash Back" (The Flash)
 "Flashback" (Star Trek: Voyager)
 "Flashback" (Static Shock)
 "Flashback: Mike and Gloria's Wedding", two episodes of All in the Family
 "Flashbacks" (South Park), or "City on the Edge of Forever"

Literature 
 Flashback (comics), a mutant character in Marvel Comics
 Flashback, a 2011 novel by Dan Simmons
 Flashback, a member of the Blood Syndicate in Milestone Comics
 Flashback Media Group, a Swedish publishing group and Internet forum host
 Flashbacks (book), a 1983 autobiography by Timothy Leary

Music
 Flashback Records (disambiguation)

Albums
 Flashback (Darin album) or the title song, 2008
 Flashback (Don Friedman album) or the title song, 1963
 Flashback (Electric Light Orchestra album), 2000
 Flashback (Ivy Queen album), 2005
 Flashback (Joan Jett album), 1993
 Flashback (Pernilla Wahlgren album) or the title song, 1989
 Flashback (single album), by After School, or the title song, 2012
 Flashback: The Best of 38 Special, 1987
 Flashback! Rock Classics Of The '70s, a charity compilation, 1991
 Flash Back, by Capsule, or the title song, 2007
 Flashbacks (album), by the Fuzztones, 1996
 Flashbacks (EP), by Contemplate, 2018
 Flashback: The Best of The J. Geils Band, by the J. Geils Band, 1985
 Flash Back 1979-1986, by Aerodrom, 1996

Songs
"Flashback" (Calvin Harris song), 2009
"Flashback"/"Komorebi no Uta", by High and Mighty Color, 2008
"Flashbacks" (song), by Inna, 2021
"Flashback", by Ashford & Simpson from Is It Still Good to Ya, 1978
"Flashback", by Ghali, 2019
"Flashback", by Icona Pop from Icona Pop, 2012
"Flashback", by Imagination from Body Talk, 1981
"Flashback", by Kelly Rowland from Ms. Kelly, 2007
"Flashback", by Laurent Garnier, 1997
"Flashback", by Ministry from The Land of Rape and Honey, 1988
"Flashback", by Simon Webbe from Smile, 2017
"Flashback", by Sonic Syndicate from Only Inhuman, 2007
"Flashback", by Tina Arena from In Deep, 1997
"Flashback", by Tomahawk from Tomahawk, 2001
"Flash Back", by Ivy Queen from The Original Rude Girl, 1998
"Flash Back", by Kelis from Wanderland, 2001
"Flash Back", by Rustie from Glass Swords, 2011
"Flashbacks", by Chris Brown from Indigo, 2019
"Flashbacks", by Marshmello from Joytime II, 2018

Roller coasters 
 Flashback (Six Flags Magic Mountain), a steel roller coaster at Six Flags Magic Mountain, US
 Flashback (Six Flags New England), a steel roller coaster at Six Flags New England, US
 Flashback (Six Flags Over Texas), a steel boomerang roller coaster at Six Flags Over Texas, US

Video games 
 Flashback (1992 video game), a science fiction cinematic platform game
 Flashback (2013 video game), a remake of the 1992 game

See also 
 

Backflash (disambiguation)